Akademik Federov Canyon is an undersea canyon in the Weddell Sea named for the Russian research vessel that worked in the northern Weddell Sea (1989). Dr. Heinrich Hinze of the Alfred Wegener Institute for Polar and Marine Research, Bremerhaven, Germany, proposed the name, which was approved in June 1997.

References
 

Canyons and gorges of Antarctica
Landforms of Coats Land